Hipponix conicus wyattae is a subspecies of small limpet-like marine gastropod mollusc in the family Hipponicidae.

Distribution  
This subspecies occurs in New Zealand.

References

Hipponicidae